The 2004–05 Primeira Liga was the 71st edition of top flight of Portuguese football. It started on 28 August 2004 with a match between Belenenses and Marítimo, and ended on 22 May 2005.

Benfica won their 31st league title, with 65 points, three points ahead of the defending champions Porto. The league was contested by 18 clubs, and was considered one of the most competitive seasons in recent years.

The first goal of the season was scored by Belenenses centre-back Rolando. The first red card of the season was given to Vitória de Setúbal's Bruno Ribeiro, and the first yellow was given to Belenenses' Juninho Petrolina in the opening match of the season. Benfica and Porto were both qualified for the 2005–06 UEFA Champions League group stage, and Sporting CP qualified for the UEFA Champions League qualifying round. At the bottom of the table, Moreirense, Estoril and Beira-Mar were relegated to the Liga de Honra. Liédson was the top scorer with 25 goals.

Promotion and relegation

Teams relegated to Liga de Honra
Alverca
Paços de Ferreira
Estrela da Amadora

Alverca, Paços de Ferreira, and Estrela da Amadora were consigned to the Liga de Honra following their final classification in 2003–04 season.

Teams promoted from Liga de Honra
Estoril
Vitória de Setúbal
Penafiel

The other three teams were replaced by Estoril, Vitória de Setúbal, and Penafiel from the Liga de Honra.

Teams

Team summaries

Managerial changes

League table

Results

Top goal scorers

Awards

Footballer of the Year
The Footballer of the Year award was won by the Portuguese Ricardo Quaresma of Porto.

Portuguese Golden Shoe
The Portuguese Golden Shoe award was won by the Brazilian Liédson of Sporting CP, scoring 25 goals.

References

External links
Portuguese Liga 2004–05 at rsssf.com
2004–05 Primeira Liga at Soccerway

Primeira Liga seasons
Port
1